Scott Jackson is an American baseball coach, currently serving as the head baseball coach at Liberty University. Jackson attended college at Campbell University and played on the Campbell Fighting Camels baseball team. Jackson served as an assistant baseball coach and recruiting coordinator at the University of North Carolina at Chapel Hill from 2009 to 2016. Jackson was named head baseball coach at Liberty University on July 17, 2016.

Head coaching record

References

External links
 Liberty profile
 North Carolina profile

Living people
Barton Bulldogs baseball coaches
Campbell Fighting Camels baseball coaches
Campbell Fighting Camels baseball players
Liberty Flames baseball coaches
North Carolina Tar Heels baseball coaches
UNC Wilmington Seahawks baseball coaches
Wofford Terriers baseball coaches
Year of birth missing (living people)